Denise Marie Ramsden (born 21 November 1990) is a Canadian former road bicycle racer. She competed at the 2012 Summer Olympics in the women's road race, finishing 27th and in the women's time trial finishing 19th.

Personal life
Ramsden graduated from the University of British Columbia in 2013, and also graduated with a Juris Doctor from the University of Toronto Faculty of Law in 2018. She now works as an associate with Canadian international corporate law firm Torys.

Major results
Sources: 

2007
 1st  Road race, National Junior Road Championships
2008
 1st  Road race, National Junior Road Championships
2009
 1st  Time trial, Canada Summer Games
 National Under-23 Road Championships
2nd Road race
2nd Time trial
2011
 National Under-23 Road Championships
1st  Road race
1st  Time trial
 Pan American Road Championships
5th Time trial
6th Road race
 7th Time trial, Pan American Games
 7th Chrono Gatineau
2012
 1st  Road race, National Road Championships
 6th Time trial, Pan American Road Championships
2013
 9th Chrono Gatineau
 10th Overall Tour Cycliste Féminin International de l'Ardèche
2014
 1st Grand Prix cycliste de Gatineau
 2nd Road race, National Road Championships
 10th Winston-Salem Cycling Classic
2015
 1st Gastown Grand Prix
 2nd Criterium, National Road Championships
 6th White Spot / Delta Road Race

References

External links
 
 
 
 

1990 births
Living people
Canadian female cyclists
Olympic cyclists of Canada
Cyclists at the 2012 Summer Olympics
University of British Columbia alumni
University of Toronto Faculty of Law alumni